American Laundromat Records is an independent record label founded in 2004 by Joe Spadaro.

ALR specializes in almost annual indie rock compilation albums, which have included tracks by OK Go, The Dresden Dolls, and The Watson Twins. Compilation tributes have been dedicated to the Pixies, The Cure, Kim Deal, Neil Young, The Smiths, and the 1984 film Repo Man. The release of a double-CD tribute album to Wes Anderson, I Saved Latin!, was released in May 2014 and includes covers of David Bowie and The Kinks.

History

Founding
American Laundromat Records was founded in April 2004 by Joe Spadaro in Huntington Village, New York on Long Island. According to Spadaro, he used a small tax-refund to produce the compilation album Transistor, which featured eight indie bands contributing two original songs each. The bands, including The Atomic Hep Cats and AM, were mostly on the East coast. Transistor had moderate success on college radio.

After several more releases, in the summer of 2006 the label relocated to Mystic, Connecticut. That year the label secured international distribution through Darla Records. Besides releasing debut EPs, LPs, and compilations, in 2007 ALR began a 7" vinyl series of split singles featuring tracks from the label's network of indie bands.

Label signings
In 2005, the label began distributing Brooklyn-based all-girl indie band the Caulfield Sisters' debut EP Say It With Fire. The band was afterwards named one of "NYC’s 10 Bands to Watch" by Time Out New York. The band was invited to perform on KEXP's Morning Show with John in NYC, and opened for Interpol. In 2009 ALR released Julie Peel's debut album Near The Sun. After the release Peel received an early invitation to showcase at SXSW in 2010, and tracks were placed in TV shows such as CW's Life Unexpected. The label also releases music by Dylan in the Movies.

In late 2013 the label signed a new band: Tele Novella, an indie group based in Austin, Texas. The pop foursome has members from a number of previous bands: guitarist/vocalist Natalie Ribbons, bassist Jason Chronis, drummer Matt Simon, and Sarah La Puerta. Ribbons was previously with Agent Ribbons, while Chronis and Simon were previously with indie band Voxtrot. They have a 7" single, "Trouble in Paradise," that came out on April 22, 2014.

Whatever, My Love is an album by The Juliana Hatfield Three, consisting of Hatfield, drummer Todd Philips, and bassist Dean Fisher. This is the band's first album in twenty two years. The lead single, "If I Could," was released in December 2014 and was premiered in Rolling Stone.

Film
In 2013 American Laundromat Records added a movie section to their website, and began taking orders for the Criterion Collection release of Repo Man on Blu-ray and DVD.

Compilations
High School Reunion - a tribute to those great 80's films!
After the success of the initial 2004 compilation, Transistor, the label began releasing indie rock-themed compilations and artist tributes on an almost yearly basis. In the fall of 2005 ALR produced its second record High School Reunion - a tribute to those great 80's films!,  featuring indie-rockers such as Frank Black, Kristin Hersh, and The Dresden Dolls, and covering songs from 80's teen films. All Music Guide called the project "One of the finest tribute records ever amassed," going on to say "let this serve as a blueprint for all future tribute sets." Pitchfork, Rolling Stone, VH1, Billboard, Spin,  NME, and other publications covered the project as well.

Artist tributes (Pixies, Neil Young, Kim, The Cure)
Afterwards came Dig For Fire - a tribute to Pixies, Cinnamon Girl - Women Artists Cover Neil Young for Charity and Gigantic - a tribute to Kim Deal. The projects included contributions by bands such as They Might Be Giants, OK Go, Mogwai, and The Rosebuds. In 2008 ALR began production on Just Like Heaven - a tribute to The Cure which was officially released on January 27, 2009. The latter was co-produced by Joe Spadaro, who produced a number of the other compilations as well. It featured covers by artists such as Tanya Donelly, The Brunettes, and Grand Duchy. The album had a positive reception, and acknowledgement from Robert Smith.

Sing Me To Sleep - Indie Lullabies
In 2010 ALR released Sing Me To Sleep - Indie Lullabies, a collection of lullabies and popular songs re-imagined as lullabies by indie artists. All proceeds from the project are donated to The Valerie Fund, a non-profit for children with cancer and blood disorders. Among the artists who contributed are Dean & Britta,  Say Hi, and Sigur Rós. Release shows with live performances by The Leisure Society, The Real Tuesday Weld, Tanya Donelly, Jenny Owen Youngs, and Julie Peel were held in tandem with the release in London and New York City.

The Smiths, Repo Man
Please Please Please: A Tribute To The Smiths was released in late 2011, with tracks by Elk City, Greg Laswell, Cinerama, Stars, and others, with Spadaro again producing. A Tribute To Repo Man was released in 2012, featuring artists such as The Tellers and Matthew Sweet. The 1984 film had a soundtrack featuring punk rock by artists like Iggy Pop and Black Flag.

I Saved Latin! A Tribute to Wes Anderson

In May 2014 American Laundromat Records released I Saved Latin!, a double-CD tribute compilation to film director Wes Anderson. In November 2013 ALR had opened up their website for pre-orders, selling a "deluxe" edition that includes a vinyl single and various clothing and objects themed to Anderson's films and characters. Among the covered artists are The Kinks, the Rolling Stones, David Bowie and The Zombies. Juliana Hatfield covers Elliott Smith's "Needle in the Hay," which was used in The Royal Tennenbaums, while Someone Still Loves You Boris Yeltsin covers "Margaret Yang's Theme" from Rushmore, which was originally made for the film by Mark Mothersbaugh. Other covers include Matt Pond's version of Nico's "These Days," and John Lennon's "Oh Yoko!" by The Ghost in You.

The album was received positively by critics, with NME calling it "cohesive and pleasingly idiosyncratic," and Delusions of Adequacy stating that "most of [the songs] embrace a shared autumnal aesthetic, which closely adheres to Anderson’s whimsical vision."

Artists
Current roster
 Caulfield Sisters
 Tanya Donelly
 Dragon Inn 3
 Juliana Hatfield
Featured on compilations

 9-Fifty
 The Abbasi Brothers
 AM 
 The Atomic Hep Cats
 Bastards of Melody
 The Bedroom Walls
 The Bennies
 Blank Pages 
 British Sea Power 
 Britta Phillips 
 The Brunettes 
 The Bunnies
 Casey Mecija (Ohbijou)
 Cassettes Won't Listen 
 Caulfield Sisters 
 Alex McAulay (Charles Douglas) 
 Cindy Wheeler
 The Commons
 The Coctails 
 Dala 
 Darcie Miner
 David Miller 
 Dean & Britta 
 Descartes a Kant
 Devics 
 Dipsomaniacs
 The Douglas Fir
 The Dresden Dolls 
 Dylan in the Movies
 Elizabeth Harper 
 Elk City 
 Eric Drew Feldman
 Euro-Trash Girl
 Fashion Victims
 Fiona Lehn 
 Francine 
 Frank Black 
 The German Art Students
 Grand Duchy 
 Heidi Gluck
 Jenny Owen Youngs 
 Jill Sobule 
 Joe Harvard Band 
 John Doe 
 John P. Strohm 
 Josie Cotton 
 Joy Zipper
 The Karma Parade 
 Kate York
 Kitty Hawk
 Kitty Karlyle
 Kristin Hersh 
 Laura Gibson 
 Le Tetsuo
 The Leisure Society 
 Lori McKenna 
 The Lovable Rouges
 Luff
 Matthew Sweet 
 Melissa Gibbs 
 The Modifiers 
 Mogwai 
 Morning Theft
 Neil Halstead 
 Nova Social 
 The Nuevos
 O+S
 OK Go 
 PC Munoz
 Papercuts 
 Peter Broderick 
 The Poems
 The Real Tuesday Weld 
 The Rest 
 Rizzo 
 The Rosebuds 
 Say Hi 
 The Smarties
 Snowbird
 Stars 
 Steve Rizzo 
 The Submarines 
 Tanya Donelly 
 Tara King
 Telekinesis 
 They Might Be Giants 
 Trespassers William 
 Underdog
 The Wading Girl
 The Watson Twins 
 The Wedding Present 
 The Wheelers
 Witch Hats 
 Wondernaut

Discography
This list is organized by catalog number, a roughly chronological number system established by the label and typically printed on or assigned to each official release.

References

External links
 Official website
 ALR on Facebook (Official)
 ALR on Instagram (Official)
 ALR on Twitter (Official)

American independent record labels
Record labels established in 2004
Alternative rock record labels
Indie rock record labels